Eduardo Ciannelli (30 August 1888 – 8 October 1969), was an Italian baritone and character actor with a long career in American films, mostly playing gangsters and criminals. He was sometimes credited as Edward Ciannelli.

Early life
Ciannelli was born in Lacco Ameno, on the island of Ischia, where his father, a doctor, owned a health spa. He studied surgery at the University of Naples, and worked briefly as a doctor, but his love of grand opera and the dramatic stage won out and he became a successful baritone, singing at La Scala and touring Europe.

He went to the United States from the Port of Naples as a first cabin saloon passenger on board the steamship San Guglielmo, which arrived at the Port of New York on 19 March 1914.  In New York, he appeared on Broadway in Oscar Hammerstein II's first musical Always You and later in Rose-Marie. He appeared in Theatre Guild productions in the late 1920s, co-starring with the Lunts (Alfred Lunt and Lynn Fontanne), and Katharine Cornell. During that period, he appeared in Uncle Vanya, The Inspector General, and The Front Page. In 1935, he played Trock Estrella in Maxwell Anderson's Winterset on Broadway and repeated his performance in the film version (1936). He played Cauchon in Shaw's Saint Joan in 1936, after which he left Broadway permanently, except for one notable occasion when he returned to play in Dore Schary's play The Devil's Advocate in 1961 and win the Tony Award for Best Featured Actor.

Career on screen

His Hollywood career consists of close to 150 film and television appearances. Notable among these are Marked Woman (1937) with Bette Davis, Strange Cargo (1940) with Joan Crawford and Clark Gable, and perhaps his most famous role, as the fanatical Thuggee guru in Gunga Din (1939) with Cary Grant. In the 1940 serial Mysterious Doctor Satan, he played the eponymous villain, an evil scientist with an army of robots.

In the 1950s and throughout the 1960s, he divided his time among Italian films such as The City Stands Trial, directed by Luigi Zampa, Attila (1954) with Anthony Quinn and Sophia Loren, Helen of Troy (1956), appearances in American TV shows such as  Climax Mystery Theater, The Time Tunnel, Perry Mason, Alfred Hitchcock Presents, Johnny Staccato, The Detectives Starring Robert Taylor, Dr. Kildare and a few films including Houseboat (1958), The Visit (1964), The Chase (1966) with Marlon Brando, and The Secret of Santa Vittoria (1969), with Anthony Quinn and Anna Magnani.

Personal life and death
Ciannelli was married to Alma Wolfe from 1918 until her death (1968). They had two sons, Eduardo and Lewis E. Ciannelli, who is also an actor.

On 8 October 1969, Ciannelli died in Rome, and was interred in the Cimitero Flaminio.

Filmography

Selected Television

References

External links

 
 
 

1888 births
1969 deaths
20th-century Italian male actors
20th-century Italian male singers
Burials at the Cimitero Flaminio
Deaths from cancer in Lazio
Italian expatriates in the United States
Italian male film actors
Italian male musical theatre actors
Italian male silent film actors
Italian male stage actors
Italian male television actors
Italian operatic baritones
People from the Province of Naples
University of Naples Federico II alumni